Roger-Henri Expert (18 April 1882 – 13 April 1955) was a French architect.

Life 

The son of a merchant, Expert first studied painting at the École des beaux-arts in Bordeaux, then from 1906 attended the École nationale supérieure des Beaux-Arts in Paris, where he studied under Gaston Redon and Gustave Umbdenstock.  In 1912 he won the second Prix de Rome and spent three years in Rome at the Villa Medici.  He returned to the Ecole as an instructor, in 1922, then as the head of his atelier in 1934, until 1953. 

In 1921 he accepted a position as Architecte des Bâtiments civils et palais nationaux (official architect of national structures), responsible for the maintenance of the Louvre Palace, Gobelins Manufactory, the Panthéon, as well as new projects for embassies, fair pavilions and other government commissions through the 1950s.  

Stylistically Expert worked in a simplified classicism tending towards Art Deco—his Tourism Pavilion for the 1925 International Exhibition of Hydropower and Tourism in Grenoble is an early and uncharacteristic showy example.  He also developed an expertise in architectural lighting.  (His dramatic floodlighting for the 1937 Paris Exposition, seen by Albert Speer, preceded Speer's "cathedral of light" at the Festliches Nürnberg by a few months.)  

Expert was made Commander of the Légion d'honneur in 1950, and appointed to the Académie des Beaux-Arts in 1954.  He died the following year, and is buried at the cemetery at Arcachon.

Work 

 reconstruction of the Hôtel-de-ville, Reims, with sculptor Carlo Sarrabezolles, 1924–1927
 Hotel Splendid and the casino, Dax, Landes, 1925–1932
 Tourism Pavilion, exposition internationale de la houille blanche et du tourisme, Grenoble, 1925
 the Rue d'Ulm buildings of the École nationale supérieure des arts décoratifs, Paris, 1927–1928
 French Embassy, Belgrade, Serbia, with sculptor Carlo Sarrabezolles, 1928–1933
 two pavilions and the illuminated lights for the Paris Colonial Exposition, with fellow architect André Granet, 1931
 decorative scheme for the SS Normandie, circa 1932
 The 10 Rue Küss School, reinforced concrete in the shape of a ship, 13th arrondissement, Paris, 1932–1934
 fountains and pools of the Jardins du Trocadéro, for the Exposition Internationale des Arts et Techniques dans la Vie Moderne (1937), Paris
 French pavilion for the 1939 New York World's Fair, with architect Pierre Patout, 1939
 interior of the French Embassy, London, 1946–1948
 residential building towers within the Old Port of Marseille, 1946–1952
 the reinforced concrete Sainte-Thérèse-de-l'Enfant-Jésus church, Metz, begun 1937, completed 1954

References

Sources 
Brief biography of Expert @ Cité de l'architecture et du patrimoine 
 this page translated from its French equivalent accessed 9/13/2010

1882 births
1955 deaths
20th-century French architects
Prix de Rome for architecture
École des Beaux-Arts alumni
Members of the Académie des beaux-arts
Commandeurs of the Légion d'honneur